Frederick Kambemba Yamusangie is a novelist, playwright and poet who was born and partly brought up in Zaire (now known as the Democratic Republic of Congo) in Africa.

He  studied communication engineering at the University of Kent at Canterbury in England and now lives in London.

He is the author of Full Circle, a literary novel set in Congo.

Selected published works
Full Circle 
Beneath the Blue Sky: A Short Book of Poetry 
The Sun, The River & The Horizon 
Poetry of Light & Quietness: Poems & Short Stories 
Lyrics of a Smiling Poet

References

External links
Yamusangie's website

Democratic Republic of the Congo novelists
Democratic Republic of the Congo male writers
Alumni of the University of Kent
Year of birth missing (living people)
Living people
Democratic Republic of the Congo poets
21st-century Democratic Republic of the Congo people